The Eastern South Slavic dialects form the eastern subgroup of the South Slavic languages. They are spoken mostly in Bulgaria and North Macedonia, and adjacent areas in the neighbouring countries. They form the so-called  Balkan Slavic linguistic area, which encompasses the southeastern part of the  dialect continuum of South Slavic.

Linguistic features

Languages and dialects 
Eastern South Slavic dialects share a number of characteristics that set them apart from the other branch of the South Slavic languages, the Western South Slavic languages. This area consists of Bulgarian and Macedonian, and according to some authors encompasses the southeastern dialect of Serbian, the so-called Prizren-Timok dialect. The last is part of the broader transitional Torlakian dialectal area. The Balkan Slavic area is also part of the Balkan Sprachbund. The external boundaries of the Balkan Slavic/Eastern South Slavic area can be defined with the help of some  linguistic structural features. Among the most important of them are: the loss of the infinitive and case declension, and the use of enclitic definite articles. In the Balkan Slavic languages, clitic doubling also occurs, which is characteristic feature of all the languages of the Balkan Sprachbund. The grammar of Balkan Slavic looks like a hybrid of “Slavic” and “Romance” grammars with some Albanian additions. The Serbo-Croatian vocabulary in both Macedonian and Serbian-Torlakian is very similar, stemming from the border changes of 1878, 1913, and 1918, when these areas came under direct Serbian linguistic influence.

Areal 
The external and internal boundaries of the linguistic sub-group between the transitional Torlakian dialect and Serbian and between Macedonian and Bulgarian languages are not clearly defined. For example, standard Serbian, which is based on its Western (Eastern Herzegovinian dialect), is very different from its Eastern (Prizren-Timok dialect), especially in its position in the Balkan Sprachbund. During the 19th century, the Balkan Slavic dialects were often described as forming the Bulgarian language. At the time, the areas east of Niš were considered under direct Bulgarian ethnolinguistic influence and in the middle of the 19th century, that motivated the Serb linguistic reformer Vuk Karadžić to use the Eastern Herzegovina dialects for his standardisation of Serbian. Bulgarian was standardized afterwards, at the end of the 19th century on the basis of its eastern Central Balkan dialect, while Macedonian was standardized in the middle of the 20th century using its west-central Prilep-Bitola dialect. Although some researchers still describe the standard Macedonian and Bulgarian languages as varieties of a pluricentric language, they have very different and remote dialectal bases. Jouko Lindstedt has assumed that the dividing line between Macedonian and Bulgarian may be in fact the Yat border, which goes through the modern region of Macedonia along the Velingrad – Petrich – Thessaloniki line. Many older Serbian scholars on the other hand believed that the Yat border divides the Serbian and Bulgarian languages. However, modern Serbian linguists such as Pavle Ivić have accepted that the main isoglosses bundle dividing Eastern and Western South Slavic runs from the mouth of the Timok river alongside Osogovo mountain and Sar Mountain. In Bulgaria this isogloss is considered the eastern most border of the broader set of transitional Torlakian dialects.

History 
Some of the phenomena that distinguish western and eastern subgroups of the South Slavic people and languages can be explained by two separate migratory waves of different Slavic tribal groups of the future South Slavs via two routes: the west and east of the Carpathian Mountains. The western Balkans was settled with Sclaveni, the eastern with Antes. The early habitat of the Slavic tribes, that are said to have moved to Bulgaria, was described as being in present Ukraine and Belarus. The mythical homeland of the Serbs and Croats lies in the area of today Bohemia, in the present-day Czech Republic and in Lesser Poland. In this way, the Balkans were settled by different groups of Slavs from different dialect areas. This is evidenced by some isoglosses of ancient origin, dividing the western and eastern parts of the South Slavic range.

The extinct Old Church Slavonic, which survives in a relatively small body of manuscripts, most of them written in the First Bulgarian Empire during the 10th century, is also classified as Eastern South Slavic. The language has an Eastern South Slavic basis with small admixture of Western Slavic features, inherited during the mission of Saints Cyril and Methodius to Great Moravia during the 9th century. New Church Slavonic represents a later stage of the Old Church Slavonic, and is its continuation through the liturgical tradition introduced by its precursor. Ivo Banac maintains that during the Middle Ages, Torlak and Eastern Herzegovinian dialects were Eastern South Slavic, but since the 12th century, the Shtokavian dialects, including Eastern Herzegovinian, began to separate themselves from the other neighboring Eastern dialects, counting also Torlakian.

The specific contact mechanism in the Balkan Sprachbund, based on the high number of second Balkan language speakers there, is among the key factors that reduced the number of Slavic morphological categories in that linguistic area. The Primary Chronicle of Kyivan Rus', written ca. 1100, claims that then the Vlachs attacked the Slavs on the Danube and settled among them. Nearly at the same time are dated the first historical records about the emerging Albanians, as living in the area to the west of the Lake Ohrid. There are references in some Byzantine documents from that period to "Bulgaro-Albano-Vlachs" and even to "Serbo-Albano-Bulgaro-Vlachs". As a consequence, case inflection, and some other characteristics of Slavic languages, were lost in Eastern South Slavic area, approximately between the 11th–16th centuries. Migratory waves were particularly strong in the 16th–19th century, bringing about large-scale linguistic and ethnic changes on the Central and Eastern Balkan South Slavic area. They reduced the number of Slavic-speakers and led to the additional settlement of Albanian and Vlach-speakers there.

Separation between Macedonian and Bulgarian

The rise of nationalism under the Ottoman Empire began to degrade its specific social system, and especially the so-called Rum millet, through constant identification of the religious creed with ethnicity. The national awakening of each ethnic group was complex and most of the groups interacted with each other.

During the Bulgarian national revival, which occurred in the 19th century, the Bulgarian and Macedonian Slavs under the supremacy of the Greek Orthodox clergy wanted to create their own Church and schools which would use a common modern "Macedono-Bulgarian" literary standard, called simply Bulgarian. The national elites active in this movement used mainly ethnolinguistic principles to differentiation between "Slavic-Bulgarian" and "Greek" groups. At that time, every ethnographic subgroup in the Macedonian-Bulgarian linguistic area wrote in their own local dialect and choosing a "base dialect" for the new standard was not an issue. Subsequently, during the 1850s and 1860s a long discussion was held in the Bulgarian periodicals about the need for a dialectal group (eastern, western or compromise) upon which to base the new standard and which dialect that should be. During the 1870s this issue became contentious, and sparked fierce debates. The general opposition arose between Western and Eastern dialects in the Eastern South Slavic linguistic area. The fundamental issue then was in which part of the Bulgarian lands the Bulgarian tongue was preserved in a most true manner and every dialectal community insisted on that. The Eastern dialect was proposed then as a basis by the majority of the Bulgarian elite. It was claiming that around the last medieval capital of Bulgaria Tarnovo, the Bulgarian language was preserved in its purest form. It was not a surprise, because the most significant part of the new Bulgarian intelligentsia came from the towns of the Eastern Sub-Balkan valley in Central Bulgaria. This proposal alienated a considerable part of the then Bulgarian population and stimulated regionalist linguistic tendencies in Macedonia. In 1870 Marin Drinov, who played a decisive role in the standardization of the Bulgarian language, practiclaly rejected the proposal of Parteniy Zografski and Kuzman Shapkarev for a mixed eastern and western Bulgarian/Macedonian foundation of the standard Bulgarian language, stating in his article in the newspaper Makedoniya: "Such an artificial assembly of written language is something impossible, unattainable and never heard of." and instead suggested that authors themselves use dialectal features in their work, thus becoming role models and allowing the natural development of a literary language. In turn, this position was heavily criticised by Eastern Bulgarian scholars and authors such as Ivan Bogorov and Ivan Vazov, the latter of whom noting that "Without the beautiful words found in the Macedonia dialects, we will be unable to make our language either richer or purer."

In this connection, it must be noted that the "Macedonian dialects" at the time generally referred to the Western Macedonian dialects rather than to all Slavic dialects in the geographic region of Macedonia. For example, scholar Yosif Kovachev from Štip in Eastern Macedonia proposed in 1875 that the "Middle Bulgarian" or "Shop dialect" of Kyustendil (in southwestern Bulgaria) and Pijanec (in eastern North Macedonia) be used as a basis for the Bulgarian literary language as a compromise and middle ground between what he himself referred to as  the "Northern Bulgarian" or Balkan dialect and the "Southern Bulgarian" or "Macedonian" dialect. Moreover, Southeastern Macedonia east of the ridges of the Pirin and then of a line stretching from Sandanski to Thessaloniki, which is located east of the Bulgarian Yat boundary and speaks Eastern Bulgarian dialects that are much more closely related to the Bulgarian dialects in the Rhodopes and Thrace than to the neighbouring Slavic dialects in Macedonia, largely did not participate at all in the debate as it was mostly Hellenophile at the time.

In 1878, a distinct Bulgarian state was established. The new state did not include the region of Macedonia which remained outside its borders in the frame of the Ottoman Empire. As a consequence, the idea of a common compromise standard was finally rejected by the Bulgarian codifiers during the 1880s and the eastern Central Balkan dialect was chosen as a basis for standard Bulgarian. Macedono-Bulgarian writers and organizations who continued to seek greater representation of Macedonian dialects in the Bulgarian standard were deemed separatists. One example is the Young Macedonian Literary Association, which the Bulgarian government outlawed in 1892. Though standard Bulgarian was taught in the local schools in Macedonia till 1913, the fact of political separation became crucial for the development of a separate Macedonian language.

With the advent of Macedonian nationalism, the idea of linguistic separatism emerged in the late 19th century, and the need for a separate Macedonian standard language subsequently appeared in the early 20th century. In the Interwar period, the territory of today's North Macedonia became part of the Kingdom of Yugoslavia, Bulgarian was banned for use and the local vernacular fell under heavy influence from the official Serbo-Croatian language. However, the political and paramilitary organizations of the Macedonian Slavs in Europe and the Americas, the Internal Macedonian Revolutionary Organization (IMRO) and the Macedonian Patriotic Organization (MPO), and even their left-wing offsets, the IMRO (United) and the Macedonian-American People's League continued to use literary Bulgarian in their writings and propaganda in the interbellum. During the World wars Bulgaria's short annexations over Macedonia saw two attempts to bring the Macedonian dialects back towards Bulgarian. This political situation stimulated the necessity of a separate Macedonian language and led gradually to its codification after the Second World War. It followed the establishment of SR Macedonia, as part of Communist Yugoslavia and finalized the progressive split in the common Macedonian–Bulgarian language.

During the first half of the 20th century the national identity of the Macedonian Slavs shifted from predominantly Bulgarian to ethnic Macedonian and their regional identity had become their national one. Although, there was no clear separating line between these two languages on level of dialect then, the Macedonian standard was based on its westernmost dialects. Afterwards, Macedonian became the official language in the new republic, Serbo-Croatian was adopted as a second official language, and Bulgarian was proscribed. Moreover, in 1946–1948 the newly standardized Macedonian language was introduced as a second language even in Southwestern Bulgaria. Subsequently, the sharp and continuous deterioration of the political relationships between the two countries, the influence of both standard languages during the time, but also the strong Serbo-Croatian linguistic influence in Yugoslav era, led to a horizontal cross-border dialectal divergence. Although some researchers have described the standard Macedonian and Bulgarian languages as varieties of a pluricentric language, they in fact have separate dialectal bases; the Prilep-Bitola dialect and Central Balkan dialect, respectively. The prevailing academic consensus (outside of Bulgaria and Greece) is that Macedonian and Bulgarian are two autonomous languages within the eastern subbranch of the South Slavic languages. Macedonian is thus an ausbau language; i.e. it is delimited from Bulgarian as these two standard languages have separate dialectal bases. The uniqueness of Macedonian in comparison to Bulgarian is a matter of political controversy in Bulgaria.

Differences between the languages  
 The word stress in Macedonian is antepenultimate, meaning it falls on the third from last syllable in words with three or more syllables, on the second syllable in words with two syllables and on the first or only syllable in words with one syllable. That means that Macedonian has fixed accent and for the most part automatically determined. The word stress in Bulgarian is free and it can appear on almost any syllable of the word, as well as on various morphological units like prefixes, roots, suffixes and articles.

 losing of the х [h] sound in Macedonian - The development of the Macedonian dialects since the 16th century has been marked by the gradual disappearance of the x sound or its replacement by в [v] or ф [f] (шетах [šetah] → шетав [šetav]). This sound in the standard Macedonian language today is found in some original Slavic words (храна [hrana], храброст [hrabrost]) and in loanwords (хемија [hemija], хигиена [higiena]), but it has disappeared from the initial and intervocalic positions, as well as from the verb system. In the standard Bulgarian language today the sound х is still found in all of that positions.

 Plural with the suffix -иња [inja] for neuter nouns - In the standard Macedonian language, some neuter nouns ending in -e form the plural with the suffix -иња. In the Bulgarian language, neuter nouns ending in -e usually form the plural with the suffix -е(та) [-(e)ta] or -е(на) [-(e)na], and the suffix -иња does not exist at all.

 Past indefinite tense with има (to have) - The standard Macedonian language is the only standard Slavic language in which there is a past indefinite tense (the so-called perfect), which is formed with the auxiliary verb to have and a verbal adjective in the neuter gender. This grammatical tense in linguistics is called have-perfect and it can be compared to the present perfect tense in English, Perfekt in German and passé composé in French. This construction of има with a verbal adjective also exists in some non-standard forms of the Bulgarian language, but it is not part of the standard language and is not as developed and widespread as in Macedonian.
Example: Гостите имаат дојдено. - The guests have arrived.

 Changing the root in some imperfect verb forms is characteristic only for the Bulgarian language. Like all Slavic languages, Macedonian and Bulgarian distinguish perfect and imperfect verb forms. However, in the Macedonian standard language, the derivation of imperfect verbs from their perfect pair takes place only with a suffix, and not with a change of the vowel in the root of the verb, as in the Bulgarian language.

 Clitic doubling - In the standard Macedonian language, clitic doubling is obligatory with definite direct and indirect objects, which contrasts with standard Bulgarian where clitic doubling is optional. Non-standard dialects of Macedonian and Bulgarian have differing rules regarding clitic doubling.

 Present active participle - this nonfinite verb form is characteristic only in the Bulgarian language (сегашно деятелно причастие). In the absence of suitable verb form in Macedonian, it's meaning most closely can be translated as a relative clause using the relative pronoun што.
Example: Уплаших се от лаещите кучета. - I was scared by the barking dogs. (Bulgarian) 
Се исплашив од кучињата што лаеја - I was scared by the dogs that barked. (Macedonian)

 Conditional mood - In Bulgarian it is formed by a special form of the auxiliary 'съм' (to be) in conjugated form, and the aorist active participle of the main verb, while in Macedonian is formed with the particle 'би' (would), and the aorist active participle of the main verb.

See also
Slavic dialects of Greece
Pomak language
Shopi

Notes

References

Languages of the Balkans
South Slavic languages
Serbian dialects
Dialects of the Macedonian language
Dialects of the Bulgarian language